In public transport, Route 14 may refer to:

Route 14 (MTA Maryland), a bus route between Baltimore and Annapolis, Maryland
London Buses route 14

14